Steven Benford, (born 14 August 1961) is the tenth Anglican Bishop of Dunedin, New Zealand, ordained and installed on 22 September 2017.

References

Anglican bishops of Dunedin
British anaesthetists
1961 births
Living people